Athetis is a genus of moths of the family Noctuidae. The genus was erected by Jacob Hübner in 1821.

Species

Former species
 Athetis miranda is now Proxenus miranda (Grote, 1873)
 Athetis mindara is now Proxenus mindara (Barnes & McDunnough, 1913)
 Athetis mendosa is now Proxenus mendosa (McDunnough, 1927)

References

Acronictinae
Noctuoidea genera